The Vermont Principals' Association (VPA) is an organization of over 300 schools in the U.S. state of Vermont that sponsor activities in numerous sports and activities.  The VPA is a member of the National Federation of State High School Associations (NFHS), which writes the rules for most U.S. high school sports and activities.

Sponsored activities
 Alpine Skiing
 Baseball
 Basketball
 Bowling
 Cheerleading
 Cross Country
 Dance
 Field Hockey
 Football
 Golf
 Gymnastics
 Ice Hockey
 Indoor Track
 Lacrosse
 Nordic Skiing
 Outdoor Track
 Snowboarding
 Soccer
 Softball
 Tennis
Ultimate (First state in the USA to organize)
 Wrestling
Volleyball (Last state in the USA to organize)

Other activities
 Debate/Forensics
 Drama
 Geography
 Math
 Science
 Spelling
 Student Council
 Student Leadership
 Youth for Justice

External links
Official website

Vermont
Sports in Vermont
Organizations established in 1945